The 1901–02 FA Cup was the 31st staging of the world's oldest association football competition, the Football Association Challenge Cup (more usually known as the FA Cup). Sheffield United won the competition for the second time, beating Southampton 2–1 in the replay of the final at Crystal Palace. The first match had finished 1–1.

Matches were scheduled to be played at the stadium of the team named first on the date specified for each round, which was always a Saturday. If scores were level after 90 minutes had been played, a replay would take place at the stadium of the second-named team later the same week. If the replayed match was drawn further replays would be held at neutral venues until a winner was determined. If scores were level after 90 minutes had been played in a replay, a 30-minute period of extra time would be played.

Calendar
The format of the FA Cup for the season had a preliminary round, five qualifying rounds, an intermediate round, three proper rounds, and the semi finals and final.

Intermediate round

The Intermediate Round featured ten ties, played between the ten winners of the Fifth qualifying round, and ten teams exempt to this stage. First Division Small Heath, along with Chesterfield, Newton Heath, Woolwich Arsenal, Burnley and Leicester Fosse from the Second Division were entered automatically into this round, as were non-league Reading, New Brighton Tower, Portsmouth and Millwall Athletic.

The other Second Division sides had to gain entry to this round through the earlier qualifying rounds. Barnsley, Blackpool, Bristol City, Burton United, Burslem Port Vale, Doncaster Rovers, Gainsborough Trinity, Glossop, Lincoln City and Stockport County, were all entered in the Third qualifying round. Of these, only Glossop and Lincoln City reached the Intermediate Round. They were joined by eight other non-league sides.

New Brighton Tower had disbanded during the summer of 1901, so Oxford City were granted a walkover.

The ten matches were played on 14 December 1901. Two matches went to replays, played in the following midweek.

First round proper
The first round proper contained sixteen ties between 32 teams. 17 of the 18 First Division sides were exempt to this round, as were West Bromwich Albion, Middlesbrough and Preston North End from the Second Division, and Southern League Southampton and Tottenham Hotspur, finalists in the two previous seasons. They joined the ten teams who won in the intermediate round.

The matches were played on Saturday 25 January 1902. Seven matches were drawn, with the replays taking place in the following midweek. Two of these then went to a second replay the following week.

Second round proper
The eight second-round matches were scheduled for Saturday, 8 February 1902. There were no replays.

Third round proper
The four quarter final matches were scheduled for Saturday 22 February 1902. There were two replays, played in the following midweek.

Semifinals

The semi-final matches were played on Saturday 15 March 1902. Sheffield United and Derby County drew their tie and had to replay it; this next match also finished in a draw, and so a second replay was played a week later. Sheffield United eventually won and went on to meet Southampton in the final.

Replay

Second Replay

Final

The final was contested by Sheffield United and Southampton at Crystal Palace. The match finished 1–1 after extra time, with the goals scored by Alf Common for Sheffield United and Harry Wood for Southampton.

In the replay, which also took place at Crystal Palace, Sheffield United won 2–1, with goals from George Hedley and Billy Barnes. Albert Brown scored Southampton's goal.

Match details

Replay

See also
FA Cup final results 1872–

References
General
Official site; fixtures and results service at TheFA.com
1901-02 FA Cup at rsssf.com
1901-02 FA Cup at soccerbase.com

Specific

 
1901-02
1901–02 domestic association football cups